Chita Charlotta Maria Smedberg (born 2 December 1971) is a Finnish sailor. She competed in the 1992 Summer Olympics and the 1996 Summer Olympics.

References

1971 births
Living people
Finnish female sailors (sport)
Olympic sailors of Finland
Sailors at the 1992 Summer Olympics – Europe
Sailors at the 1996 Summer Olympics – Europe
Sportspeople from Helsinki